Ocean Tower SPI was an unfinished, 31-story condominium in South Padre Island, Cameron County, Texas, United States, that was imploded when it was deemed unsafe to remain standing. Though the developers initially vowed to fix the problem, studies discovered that repairs would have been too expensive, and plans for its demolition were announced in September 2009. It was nicknamed "Faulty Towers" and "The Leaning Tower of South Padre Island".

Plans
The Ocean Tower project was developed by Coastal Constructors Southwest Ventures, a subsidiary of Zachry Construction. It was designed as a 31-story luxury high-rise featuring 147 residences, a gym, swimming pools, spa, and a media room. The building was designed to withstand extreme winds with three massively reinforced core walls. The location was to have allowed the residences to have views across the Gulf of Mexico and the Laguna Madre. Units were to retail for $2 million.

Construction
After a month of structural testing the construction of Ocean Tower began on April 5, 2006. Pier supports in the shifting clay more than  underground began buckling, stressing beams and columns, causing cracking, spalling, and breaking, eventually causing the building to lean towards the northwest corner, cracking the wall of the adjacent garage, which abuts the tower. The official explanation was that the parking garage and the tower were mistakenly built connected, forcing the weight down upon the garage instead of on the tower's core. The use of expandable clay, which compresses when weight is applied to it, compounded the issue and allowed the parking garage to remain relatively unsettled compared to the tower itself. Preliminary evaluation showed that the tower's core had sunk , while the attached parking lot had shifted less than half that distance.

Construction was halted in the summer of 2008. Soon after, the building became known as the "leaning tower of South Padre" and was viewed as a looming eyesore.

In a letter dated July 2, 2008 the developers informed buyers about the problems that they had encountered. They reassured them "Your unit will be delivered, and the building will be stronger and safer than ever", stating that completion of the construction would be delayed by "6 to 9 months". The proposed fixes would have the garage beams separated from the tower, and new columns to be placed under the beams. Once the columns had been fully braced, then garage beams would be cut away and the foundation would be repaired. By this time more than 100 of the condominiums had been sold.

On November 4, 2008, after several engineering studies had discovered that the work needed to fix the building would prevent the project from becoming economically viable, the development was officially cancelled and purchasers were released from their unit purchase agreements.

Demolition
Any materials that could be recycled or resold, including fixtures and fittings, steel, flooring, and windows, were removed from the building before demolition. The nearby Texas Park Road 100 was closed on safety grounds just before the building was set to be razed.

The implosion was watched by a large crowd, many of whom stayed in local hotels and visited restaurants in the area. Island spokesman Dan Quandt described the event as "a very good short-term economic boost for South Padre Island".

Lawsuit
The developers have filed a $125 million lawsuit against geotechnical engineering firm Raba-Kistner Engineering and Consulting of San Antonio and structural engineers Datum Engineers of Austin and Dallas.

See also
 List of tallest voluntarily demolished buildings

References

Buildings and structures in Cameron County, Texas
Demolished buildings and structures in Texas
Skyscrapers in Texas
Unfinished buildings and structures in the United States
Buildings and structures demolished in 2009
Former skyscrapers
Inclined towers in the United States
Buildings and structures demolished by controlled implosion